Yoell van Nieff (born 17 June 1993) is a Dutch footballer who plays as a midfielder for Puskás Akadémia FC in Hungary. He formerly played on loan for FC Dordrecht and Excelsior and for Heracles Almelo. Besides the Netherlands, he has played in Hungary.

Career statistics

Club

Honours

Club
Groningen
KNVB Cup (1): 2014–15

References

External links
 
 
 Voetbal International profile 

1993 births
Living people
Footballers from Groningen (city)
Association football defenders
Dutch footballers
Eredivisie players
Eerste Divisie players
FC Groningen players
FC Dordrecht players
Excelsior Rotterdam players
Heracles Almelo players
Puskás Akadémia FC players
Nemzeti Bajnokság I players
Expatriate footballers in Hungary
Dutch expatriate sportspeople in Hungary